Holderness was a non-metropolitan district in Humberside, England. It was abolished on 1 April 1996 and replaced by East Riding of Yorkshire.

Political control
The first election to the council was held in 1973, initially operating as a shadow authority before coming into its powers on 1 April 1974. Political control of the council from 1973 until its abolition in 1996  was held by the following parties:

Council elections
1973 Holderness District Council election
1976 Holderness District Council election (New ward boundaries)
1979 Holderness Borough Council election
1983 Holderness Borough Council election
1987 Holderness Borough Council election
1991 Holderness Borough Council election

Borough result maps

By-election results

References

External links

 
Holderness
Council elections in Humberside
District council elections in England